Karim El Kerem (born November 2, 1987) is a Spanish-American actor. He is well known in Europe and Latin America for performances in such television shows as Física o Química, La reina del sur, Velvet Colección. And films as No Rest for the Wicked.

Career 
Karim El Kerem was born in Brooklyn, New York to a Spanish mother and an Egyptian father. When he was one year old he moved to Spain with his family.

El Kerem studied acting at Juan Carlos Corazza's Studio, and began his professional acting career in 2008 with his role as Isaac on the Spanish television show Física o Química.
He was also a recurring guest star in the television show Pasapalabra.

In 2011 he played Mohamed, son of Fátima Mansur, in the telenovela La reina del sur, for Telemundo and Antena 3.

El-Kerem also appeared in the 2011 film No Rest for the Wicked directed by Enrique Urbizu. Film winner of six Goya Awards.

In 2012, Karim had a role in the television show Frágiles for Telecinco.

In 2014 he played Kamal in the tv Show "El Príncipe" for Telecinco.

In 2018 El Kerem had a supporting role in "Velvet Colección" and appeared in Centro Médico. 

Karim is filming the tv show "La Unidad" for Movistar+.

Television

Film

References

External links 

 Imdb.com Karim El-Kerem

Male actors from Madrid
American emigrants to Spain
1987 births
Living people
American male television actors
American male film actors
Male actors from New York (state)